The list of ship launches in 1807 includes a chronological list of some ships launched in 1807.


References

1807
Ship launches